This is a list of people who have served as Mayor of the city of Fort Myers in the U.S. state of Florida.

List of mayors of the City of Fort Myers

List of mayors of the Town of Fort Myers

References

Fort Myers, Florida